126 Tauri (126 Tau) is a blue subgiant star in the constellation Taurus. Its apparent magnitude is 4.83. It is also a binary star, with an orbital period of 111 years.

References

Taurus (constellation)
B-type subgiants
Tauri, 126
Durchmusterung objects
037711
026777
1946
Binary stars